Lech Jęczmyk (born January 10, 1936) is a Polish publicist, essayist, writer and translator. Critic of science-fiction, chief editor of Nowa Fantastyka from 1990–1992, editor of several science-fiction series and anthologies.

His essays were collected in:
 Eseje (2005)
 Trzy końce historii czyli Nowe Średniowiecze (2006)

References 

  Lech Jęczmyk in Encyklopedia Solidarności

1936 births
Living people
Polish literary critics
Polish essayists
Polish male writers
Male essayists
Polish translators
Recipients of the Silver Medal for Merit to Culture – Gloria Artis
Recipient of the Meritorious Activist of Culture badge

International Writing Program alumni